Reduvius sonoraensis is a species of assassin bug in the family Reduviidae. It is found in Central America and North America. It can have two types that are discernably different by the fifth instar: those with short wing pads and those with long wing pads.

References

Further reading

 

Reduviidae
Articles created by Qbugbot
Insects described in 1942